The 22119/22120  Chhatrapati Shivaji Maharaj Terminus–Madgaon Junction Tejas Express is one of India's full-AC train fleet introduced by Indian Railways connecting  in Maharashtra and  in Goa. It is currently being operated with 22119/22120 train numbers on five days a week basis but during monsoon season the train will run thrice a week. The train route was officially extended from Karmali to Madgaon Junction on 1st November 2022.

The coaches are manufactured at the Rail Coach Factory, Kapurthala.

Coach composition 

There are 12 AC Chair Car and they can seat up to 78 passengers each (3+2) configuration and 1 Executive Class coach (in 2+2 configuration).  The Executive Class coach has a seating capacity of 56 passengers and adjustable head-rests, arm support and leg support. All doors are centrally controlled.

It is designed by Indian Railways with features of LED screen display to show information about stations, train speed etc. and will have announcement system as well, Vending machines for tea, coffee and milk, Bio toilets in compartments as well as CCTV cameras, water level indicators, tap sensors, hand dryers, integrated braille displays, LED TV for each passenger with phone sockets, local cuisine, celebrity chef menu, WiFi, tea and coffee vending machines, magazines, snack tables, fire & smoke detection and suppression system.

Onboard catering service charges are included in the fare. If the passengers do not wish to avail it at the time of booking and want to purchase meals on board, they will have to pay Rs 50 extra per service in addition to the actual catering charges.

As with most train services in India, coach composition may be amended at the discretion of Indian Railways depending on demand.

Service

22119/22120 Mumbai Chhatrapati Shivaji Maharaj Terminus–Madgaon Junction Tejas Express currently operates 5 days a week, covering 581 km in 8 hrs 50 mins (66 km/hr average speed).

Route & halts 

The important halts of the train are :

Loco link 

Previously, this train was hauled by two Kalyan-based WDM-3D twins or Pune-based WDM-3A twins pull the train from Mumbai to Karmali Since 24th November 2022, this train is now hauled by a Bhusaval-based WAP-4 electric locomotive as the route is now fully-electrified.

Gallery

See also 
 Humsafar Express
 Tejas Express
 Karmali railway station
 Chhatrapati Shivaji Maharaj Terminus

Sister trains
 Lokmanya Tilak Terminus–Karmali AC Superfast Express
 Dadar–Madgaon Jan Shatabdi Express
 Konkan Kanya Express
 Mandovi Express
 Lokmanya Tilak Terminus–Madgaon AC Double Decker Express

References

SExternal links 
Mumbai CSMT–Karmali Tejas Express
Karmali–Mumbai CSMT Tejas Express

Tejas Express trains
Rail transport in Maharashtra
Rail transport in Goa
2017 establishments in Goa
Transport in Mumbai
Transport in Panaji
Railway services introduced in 2017
Chhatrapati Shivaji Terminus
2017 establishments in Maharashtra